The Roman Catholic Diocese of Bururi is a diocese located in the city of Bururi in the Ecclesiastical province of Bujumbura in Burundi.

History
 June 6, 1961: Established as Diocese of Bururi from the Metropolitan Archdiocese of Gitega

Special churches
The Cathedral is the Cathédrale Christ Roi in Bururi.

Leadership
 Bishops of Bururi (Roman rite)
 Bishop Joseph Martin, M. Afr. (June 6, 1961  – September 17, 1973)
 Bishop Bernard Bududira (September 17, 1973  – November 19, 2005)
 Bishop Venant Bacinoni (June 25, 2007  – February 15, 2020)
 Bishop Salvatore Niciteretse (February 15, 2020 – ...)

See also
Roman Catholicism in Burundi

References

External links
 GCatholic.org
 Catholic Hierarchy 

Bururi
Bururi
Christian organizations established in 1961
Roman Catholic dioceses and prelatures established in the 20th century
1961 establishments in Ruanda-Urundi